Luigi Pellegrini Scaramuccia (1616–1680) was an Italian painter and artist biographer of the Baroque period. He was a pupil, along with Giovanni Domenico Cerrini of the painter Guido Reni.

Born in Perugia to the painter Giovanni Antonio Scaramuccia, he left paintings throughout the peninsula, including Rome, Bologna, and Milan. He is more highly regarded as a biographer or historian than the former. His book Le finezze de' pennelli italiani was one of the earliest compilations of biographies that included baroque artists from Bologna and Milan (published in 1674 in Pavia).  Written as a pseudonymous account of travels through Italy, he appears to plagiarize extensively from prior biographers, including Raphaël Trichet du Fresne in his introduction to Leonardo’s treatise in 1651.

In painting, he worked under Carlo Cignani and alongside Lorenzo Pasinelli, Girolamo Bonini, and Giovanni Maria Galli-Bibiena, in the fresco decoration of the ‘’Sala Farnese’’ in the Palazzo d'Accursio (now City Hall) in Bologna.

He also painted in 1670 a canvas of Federico Borromeo Visits the Leper House During the Plague of 1630 for the Ambrosiana Library in Milan; this was part of a large project promoted by Antonio Busca to decorate the Accademia Ambrosiana with works honoring the founder, Federico Borromeo.  The works recall the large Quadroni of St. Charles painted about the life of Carlo Borromeo for the Duomo of Milan.  Other painters in this project were Ambrogio Besozzi, Cesare Fiore, Andrea Lanzani, and Antonio Busca himself. The Brera Gallery has a portrait of Scaramucci painted by his friend, Francesco Cairo. One of his pupils was Andrea Lanzano of San Colombano.

References

 Geddo, Cristina, Luigi Scaramuccia: Biografia; Luigi Scaramuccia: Cristo flagellato, Cannobio, Santuario della Pietà, in Pittura tra il Verbano e il Lago d'Orta dal Medioevo al Settecento, ed. M. Gregori, Milano, Cariplo, 1996, pp. 295–297, plate 91 (https://unige.academia.edu/CristinaGeddo, ad vocem, with updated abstract).

Notes

1616 births
1680 deaths
People from Perugia
Italian art historians
17th-century Italian painters
Italian male painters
Italian Baroque painters